Abbas Shah Gol (also Romanized as ʿAbbās Shāh Gol) is a village in Dust Mohammad Rural District, in the Central District of Hirmand County, Sistan and Baluchestan Province, Iran. At the 2006 census, its population was 39, in 7 families.

References 

Populated places in Hirmand County